The 2025 UEFA Champions League final will be the final match of the 2024–25 UEFA Champions League, the 70th season of Europe's premier club football tournament organised by UEFA, and the 33rd season since it was renamed from the European Champion Clubs' Cup to the UEFA Champions League. It will be played at Allianz Arena in Munich, Germany in May 2025. This will be the first UEFA Champions League final played under the new format of the Swiss-system.

The winners will earn the right to play against the winners of the 2024–25 UEFA Europa League in the 2025 UEFA Super Cup.

Venue
This will be the second UEFA Champions League final hosted at the Allianz Arena; the first was held in 2012. Overall, it will be the fifth European Cup final to be held in Munich, with the 1979, 1993, and 1997 finals taking place at the Olympiastadion. The final will also be the ninth to take place in Germany, having also taken place in Stuttgart in 1959 and 1988, Gelsenkirchen in 2004, and Berlin in 2015, equalling the record of nine European Cup finals held in Italy and Spain. The Allianz Arena previously hosted matches at the 2006 FIFA World Cup, and was chosen as a host venue for UEFA Euro 2020 and UEFA Euro 2024.

Host selection
On 16 July 2021, the UEFA Executive Committee announced that the Atatürk Olympic Stadium in Istanbul would host the 2023 UEFA Champions League final instead of Munich. This was due to the fact that Istanbul twice had the Champions League final intended for their city relocated owing to the COVID-19 pandemic. Originally planned as hosts for the 2020 final, the match was moved to Lisbon and the final hosts shifted back a year, with Istanbul instead awarded the 2021 final. However, weeks prior to the final, the 2021 fixture was moved to Porto due to travel restrictions.

Munich, originally selected to host the 2022 final by the UEFA Executive Committee during their meeting in Ljubljana, Slovenia on 24 September 2019, was later planned to host the 2023 final after the shifting of the final hosts. However, the city was awarded the 2025 final instead after being bumped from 2023 by Istanbul.

Match

Details
The "home" team (for administrative purposes) will be determined by an additional draw held after the quarter-final and semi-final draws.

See also
2025 UEFA Europa League final
2025 UEFA Europa Conference League final
2025 UEFA Women's Champions League final

Notes

References

External links

2025
Final
Scheduled association football competitions
May 2025 sports events in Europe
International club association football competitions hosted by Germany
2020s in Munich